Live at Myrtle Beach is the seventh live album released by the Athens, GA based band Widespread Panic. The album was recorded during a show in Fall 2003 at the House of Blues in Myrtle Beach, SC. It was released on February 22, 2005.

Track listing

Disc one
"Ain't Life Grand" (Widespread Panic) – 5:31
"Conrad the Caterpillar" (Widespread Panic) – 9:25
"Don't Wanna Lose You" (Widespread Panic) – 17:10
"Dirty Business" (Dalton) – 12:37
"Stop Breakin' Down Blues" (Johnson) – 7:37

Disc two
"Papa's Home" (Widespread Panic) – 23:55
"Henry Parsons Died" (Hutchens, Carter) – 6:44
"Action Man" (Widespread Panic) – 4:42
"Postcard" (Guenther/Widespread Panic) – 4:26
"Bowlegged Woman" (Carter, Rush) – 13:24
"Chilly Water" (Widespread Panic) – 9:42

Personnel
Widespread Panic
John Bell – guitar, vocals
John Hermann – keyboards, vocals
George McConnell – guitar, vocals
Todd Nance – drums, vocals
Domingo S. Ortiz – percussion
Dave Schools – bass

Guest Performers
John Keane – pedal steel

Production
John Keane – producer, mixing
Billy Field – engineer
Ken Love – mastering
Brad Blettenberg – assistant engineer
Flournoy Holmes – artwork, design, photography
Ellie MacKnight – package coordinator
Oade Brothers – assistant engineer
Chris Rabold – assistant engineer
Thomas Smith – photography

References

External links
Widespread Panic website
Everyday Companion

2005 live albums
Widespread Panic live albums
Albums produced by John Keane (record producer)